Igumentsy is a rural locality (a village) in Oktyabrskoye Rural Settlement, Vyaznikovsky District, Vladimir Oblast, Russia. The population was 13 as of 2010.

Geography 
Igumentsy is located 14 km west of Vyazniki (the district's administrative centre) by road. Bolshoy Kholm is the nearest rural locality.

References 

Rural localities in Vyaznikovsky District